Theodore Frelinghuysen (1787–1862) was an American politician.

Theodore Frelinghuysen may also refer to:

 Theodorus Jacobus Frelinghuysen (c. 1691–c. 1747), German-American Dutch-Reformed minister, theologian and the progenitor of the Frelinghuysen family in the USA
 Theodorus Jacobus Frelinghuysen II (1724–1759) or Theodorus Frelinghuysen, Jr., theologian in Albany, New York
 Theodore Frelinghuysen Seward (1835–1902) American musician and New Thought Christian writer in New York and New Jersey 
 Theodore Frelinghuysen (New York socialite) (1860–1931), member of New York Society during the Gilded Age